Live (2023 film) is an upcoming Russian psychological drama film directed by Karen Oganesyan about a young blogger who, in pursuit of hype, loses his moral character. The cast is represented by Pavel Chernyshyov and Kirill Käro.

Live was theatrically released in Russia on April 6, 2023, by the White Nights.

Plot 
A rich blogger who travels to the Caucasus to participate in the filming of a test drive of a car. And suddenly his assistant steps on a combat mine, and the blogger wants to take advantage of this. From now on, it's every man for himself...

Cast 
 Pavel Chernyshyov as Egor
 Kirill Käro as Alexandr
 Irina Voronova as Polina
 Angelina Strechina
 Soslan Fidarov
 Ulyana Pilipenko
 Anastasiya Todoresku

Production 
Principal photography will take place in March to April 2021 in Moscow and the Republic of North Ossetia–Alania, and the film companies Kargo Film, Irsna Media and Movses Film are responsible for production.

Producer Benik Arakelyan, back in his student years, he had the idea to show a person against the backdrop of the natural elements. The period of self-isolation helped him finalize the idea.

Release 
The premiere date in Russia is scheduled in cinemas across the country from April 6, 2023. The distributor of this Russian psychological drama in the territory of the Russian Federation is the White Nights company.

References 

2023 films
2020s psychological drama films
2020s Russian-language films
Psychological drama films
Russian thriller drama films
Films shot in Moscow
Films shot in the North Caucasus
Upcoming Russian-language films